Tsnori is a town (since 1965) in Georgia’s Kakheti region. It is located in the Alazani Valley near the town Sighnaghi and has a population of 4,815 (2014 Georgia Census).

Archaeological digs at Tsnori have revealed clusters of kurgans which contain the most elaborate burial mounds among the Early Bronze Age kurgan cultures of South Caucasia.

See also
 Kakheti

References 

Cities and towns in Kakheti
Bronze Age in Georgia